Beach volleyball competition at the 2014 Asian Beach Games was held in Phuket, Thailand from 16 to 23 November 2014 at Karon Beach, Phuket.

Medalists

Medal table

Results

Men

Preliminary

Pool A

Pool B

Pool C

Pool D

Pool E

Pool F

Pool G

Pool H

Knockout round

Women

Preliminary

Pool A

Pool B

Pool C

Pool D

Knockout round

References

Match results men
Match results women

External links
Official website
AVC page for Asian Beach Games

2014 Asian Beach Games events
Asian Beach Games
2014